The Preston Raiders were a Canadian Junior "B" ice hockey team from the town of Preston, Ontario which later became Cambridge, Ontario.

History
The team started out as the Preston Pals of the Central Junior C Hockey League.  They changed their name to the Raiders in 1965.

In 1969, the Preston Raiders joined the Central Junior 'B' Hockey League. In 1974, the team left the Central league and joined the Waterloo-Wellington Junior 'B' Hockey League, which was a predecessor league to the current Midwestern Junior B Hockey League.  In 1976, the team became the Cambridge Raiders for one season, before folding.

Season-by-season record

Ice hockey teams in Ontario
Defunct ice hockey teams in Canada

References